Julia Hippisley-Cox  is a British epidemiologist, and Professor of Clinical Epidemiology and General Practice at the University of Oxford.

Hippisley-Cox earned a medical degree from Sheffield University Medical School in 1989.

References

Living people
British women epidemiologists
Academics of the University of Oxford
Fellows of the Royal College of Physicians
Year of birth missing (living people)
Alumni of the University of Sheffield